Ottey is a surname. Notable people with the name include:

 Allan Ottey (born 1992), Jamaican footballer
 George Ottey (1824–1891), English clergyman, educationalist and cricketer
 Merlene Ottey (born 1960), Jamaican-Slovenian sprinter
 Milton Ottey (born 1959), Jamaican-Canadian high jumper